Reiffel is a surname. Notable people with the surname include:

 Charles Reiffel (1862–1942), American lithographer and painter
 Leonard Reiffel (1927–2017), American physicist and writer
 Lou Reiffel (1910–1977), Australian rules footballer
 Paul Reiffel (born 1966), Australian cricketer and umpire
 Ron Reiffel (1932–2018), Australian rules footballer

See also
 Ben Reifel (1906–1990), public administrator and politician
 George C. Reifel Migratory Bird Sanctuary, in British Columbia